Gregory Livingston Harper (born June 1, 1956) is a former American politician who served as the U.S. representative for  from 2009 to 2019. He is a member of the Republican Party.  The district includes the wealthier portions of the state capital, Jackson, along with most of that city's suburbs.  Other cities in the district include Meridian, Natchez, Starkville, and Brookhaven.

In January 2018, Harper announced he would retire from Congress and not run for re-election.

Early life, education and career 
Harper was born in Jackson, Mississippi. He spent eight years working as Chairman of the Rankin County, Mississippi Republican Party, and served as a delegate to the 2000 Republican National Convention. He was appointed by the party as an observer during the controversial 2000 Florida presidential recount.

Harper graduated from Mississippi College in 1978 with a degree in Chemistry and from the University of Mississippi School of Law in 1981. He has worked as a private practice attorney since receiving this degree. He was the prosecuting attorney for the cities of Brandon, Mississippi and Richland, Mississippi.

U.S. House of Representatives

Committee assignments 
 Joint Committee of Congress on the Library (Chairman)
 Committee on Energy and Commerce
 Subcommittee on Digital Commerce and Consumer Protection(Vice Chairman)
 Subcommittee on Environment and Economy
 Committee on Ethics
 Committee on House Administration (Chairman)
 Subcommittee on Elections

Caucus memberships
 Republican Study Committee
 Congressional Arts Caucus
 Veterinary Medicine Caucus
U.S.-Japan Caucus

Tenure
Harper introduced the Gabriella Miller Kids First Research Act (H.R. 2019; 113th Congress) into the House on May 16, 2013. The bill, which passed in both the House and the Senate, would end taxpayer contributions to the Presidential Election Campaign Fund and divert the money in that fund to pay for research into pediatric cancer through the National Institutes of Health. The total funding for research would come to $126 million over 10 years. As of 2014, the national conventions got about 23% of their funding from the Presidential Election Campaign Fund.

Harper was ranked as the 89th most bipartisan member of the U.S. House of Representatives during the 114th United States Congress (and the most bipartisan member of the U.S. House of Representatives from Mississippi) in the Bipartisan Index created by The Lugar Center and the McCourt School of Public Policy.

In December 2017, as chairman of the House Committee on Administration, Harper supported a review of overhauling the Congressional Accountability Act which makes it harder for victims of sexual harassment to come forward with allegations than victims in the private sector. Harper said a review was "long overdue".

Elections
Gregg Harper won the Republican nomination in Mississippi's 3rd congressional district on April 1, 2008 with 57% of the vote.  This was tantamount to election in this heavily Republican district.  He defeated his Democratic opponent, Joel Gill in the November General Election winning 63% of the vote.

Personal life
He is a deacon of Crossgates Baptist Church in Brandon, Mississippi, where he had also been a Sunday School teacher.

He has a 31-year old son with Fragile X syndrome; as a Congressman, Harper started a congressional internship program for students with developmental disabilities through the Mason Life Program at George Mason University.

References

External links 

 
 
 

|-

|-

|-

|-

|-

1956 births
21st-century American politicians
American prosecutors
Baptists from Mississippi
Lawyers from Jackson, Mississippi
Living people
Mississippi College alumni
Politicians from Jackson, Mississippi
People from Pearl, Mississippi
Recipients of the Order of Brilliant Star
Republican Party members of the United States House of Representatives from Mississippi
University of Mississippi alumni